Oral Kwame Ofori (born January 26, 1980), professionally known as Oral Ofori, is a Ghanaian-American award-winning digital media producer and blogger, freelance journalist, entrepreneur, and writer.  Originally from Tema, he is also the founder of the US-based communication consultancy TheAfricanDream LLC. In February 2018 Ofori took on a language interpretation job as a level II interpreter of the Twi and Ga language with the Fairfax County Public Schools system. In December of 2021 Mr. Ofori started work with the Embassy of Ghana, Washington, D.C. as Head of the Customer Relations Office under Ambassador Alima Mahama.

Early life, career and education 

Born to Ghanaian parents in Tema, Oral Ofori graduated from Chemu Senior High School in 1998 and completed his journalism studies at the London School of Journalism in 2006.  The following year, he began an internship with the Voice of America (VOA) in Washington, D.C., as a radio news reporter and contributor.

Ofori is also a columnist for Ghanaian news websites such as GhanaWeb, ModernGhana, and the US-based Afrikan Post newspaper.  He has also contributed to publications including the Los Angeles Sentinel, Swedish news magazine Beyond Borders, the Dallas Weekly, the North Dallas Gazette, and the Baltimore Times.

Since 2014, Ofori has been host and producer of #TheAfricanDream show aired on Fairfax, Virginia Public-access television's channel 30.

Reporting and interviews 

Ofori formally started a blog in 2011  and has since then written about or interviewed persons including Mayor Peter Bossman, scientist and fiber optics innovator Dr. Thomas Mensah, Anthony K. Wutoh; Howard University Provost and Chief Academic Officer, and musician and artist Koby Maxwell.

Some of his other interview subjects have been Deborah Addo of INOVA Hospitals in the US, Grammy-nominated musician and activist Rocky Dawuni, sportscaster Sonny Young of Voice Of America, historic Quander family member Rohulamin Quander, Hege Hertzberg, former Ambassador of Norway to Ghana, Gambia, Mali, Burkina Faso and Liberia, and among others Howard University Professor Michael C. Campbell.

Recognitions

References

External links 

 
 
 
 www.oralofori.com

Ghanaian journalists
1980 births
African journalism
Living people
People from Tema
Ghanaian bloggers
Ghanaian mass media people
American people of Ghanaian descent
Alumni of the London School of Journalism
Ghanaian expatriates in the United States